) is the local government council for Na h-Eileanan Siar (the Outer Hebrides) council area of Scotland. It is based in Stornoway in the Isle of Lewis.

Name
Comhairle nan Eilean Siar is the only local council in Scotland to have a Gaelic-only name. The original name, Western Isles Council, was retracted in 1997 under the Local Government (Gaelic Names) (Scotland) Act 1997, and the former "Western Isles" council area is now officially named "Na h-Eileanan Siar", even in English language contexts.

History
In 1975, the council was created as Western Isles Council, 57 years after the creation of Na h-Eileanan an Iar for elections to the House of Commons of the Parliament of the United Kingdom (the constituency being named, when created, Western Isles). Since 1999, the area has also been represented by the Na h-Eileanan an Iar constituency of the Scottish Parliament, with the same boundaries.

When the Bank of Credit and Commerce International collapsed in 1991, the then Western Isles Council lost £35m invested there, compelling a large increase in its council tax rate and leading to the resignation of Council Convener Donald Macauley.  Despite its initial losses, by 2012 the Council had gained a net profit of £1.5 million from dividend repayments due to favourable exchange rates.

Representing Scotland's only majority Gaelic-speaking local authority area, the council pioneered the use of Gaelic-medium education in the 1980s.  In 2020, Gaelic became the default language of instruction for all primary school pupils.  

In 1997, the Western Isles Council was renamed as Comhairle nan Eilean Siar.

Elections 

General elections to the council are held on a five-year cycle, the last were held in 2022.

From 1975 until 2007, council elections used the first past the post system of election; the last elections of this type elected 31 councillors, elected by 31 single-member wards.

In 2007, under the Local Governance (Scotland) Act 2004, the single transferable vote system, together with multi-member wards, was used for the first time, each ward electing three or four councillors. This system is designed to produce a degree of proportional representation.

Political representation

The 2022 election and subsequent by-elections resulted in the following composition:

Leaders

Political Leaders

Convenors

See also
 Constitutional status of Orkney, Shetland and the Western Isles
 Lerwick Declaration

References

External links 
 Comhairle nan Eilean Siar website
 Ward maps, with links re councillors

.
Na h-Eileanan Siar
Politics of the Outer Hebrides
Stornoway